Oumar N'Diaye (born December 9, 1988) is a Mauritanian professional footballer who for Blagnac FC.

External links
 
 http://www.uefa.com/uefaeuropaleague/clubs/player=1907616/index.html

Living people
1988 births
People from Nouakchott
Association football midfielders
Mauritanian footballers
Ligue 1 players
Ligue 2 players
Algerian Ligue Professionnelle 1 players
Toulouse FC players
FC Metz players
Luzenac AP players
Limoges FC players
MO Béjaïa players
Blagnac FC players
Mauritania international footballers
Mauritanian expatriate footballers
Mauritanian expatriate sportspeople in Algeria
Expatriate footballers in Algeria
Mauritanian expatriate sportspeople in France
Expatriate footballers in France

fr:Oumar N'Diaye
it:Oumar N'Diaye (calciatore 1988)